Sirje Tennosaar (née Sirje Arbi; 5 June 1943 – 23 April 2021) was a Soviet and Estonian actress and television presenter.

Tennosaar was a member of the Endla Theatre in 1963, before moving to the Estonian Drama Theatre in 1966. She then became a television presenter at Eesti Televisioon (ETV) from 1971 until 1991. Then she moved to Kanal 2 from 1993 to 2000.

Tennosaar was married to singer and journalist Kalmer Tennosaar from 1964 until 1978. Her daughter is actress Liina Tennosaar. She died on 23 April 2021, aged 77.

References

1943 births
2021 deaths
Estonian film actresses
Estonian television presenters
Soviet film actresses
Soviet television presenters
Place of death missing
Estonian television actresses
Soviet television actresses
20th-century Estonian actresses
21st-century Estonian actresses
Actresses from Tartu